Dejan Đorđević (also transliterated Dejan Djordjević; born 20 September 1992) is a Serbian footballer, who plays as a forward for Vestri.

Club career
Đorđević started his senior career with Sloga Bajina Bašta in 2011. In his debut season for the first team, he collected 23 matches in the Serbian League West. Đorđević stayed with the club until 2015, and he also played for Sloga Požega for a period during the 2014–15 season. In summer 2015, Đorđević Sloboda Užice. Đorđević scored the first hat-trick in his professional career for Sloboda Užice in 24 fixture match of the 2015–16 Serbian First League season against Radnički Kragujevac, played on 28 April 2016. Scoring 10 goals on 30 played matches, Đorđević was nominated for the best player of the season, by the supporters' choice. Next summer he signed with Maltese Premier League side Birkirkara, where he noted 5 caps at all competitions for the first half-season. At the beginning of 2017, he returned to Serbia and joined FK Zemun. Later, in April same year he terminated the contract and left the club, making just 2 appearances as a back-up player. In summer 2017, Đorđević returned to Sloboda Užice.

References

External links
 
 
 
 

1992 births
Living people
People from Bajina Bašta
Association football forwards
Serbian footballers
FK Sloboda Užice players
FK Zemun players
Serbian First League players
Serbian expatriate footballers
Serbian expatriate sportspeople in Malta
Expatriate footballers in Malta
Birkirkara F.C. players
Maltese Premier League players